The People's Mosque is a modern mosque in Sana’a that is the largest in Yemen. It lies in the southern outskirts of the city, south of the Al Sabeen Maternal Hospital. Originally named Al Saleh Mosque, it was inaugurated in November 2008 by the late Yemeni President Ali Abdullah Saleh. The building cost nearly US$60 million to construct. Open to non-Muslims, the mosque is frequented by tourists, and promotes moderate Islam.

History

Saleh was criticized in 2008 for undertaking such a grand project when the country was suffering from socio-economic problems, wherein 42% of Yemenis lived in poverty and one in five were malnourished, according to United Nations estimates at the time. Several accidents occurred during its construction. The minarets collapsed multiple times, resulting in some deaths. After these occurrences, the site was used to build the Islamic college and the garden next to the mosque. It is also mentioned that Hayel Said, a local businessman, was threatened with reprisals and annulment of his business licenses, if he did not pay for the building of the mosque.

The mosque was the site of fighting during the conflict between Houthi and pro-Saleh forces in December 2017. At the time, rumours circulated in Sanaa that the Houthis intended to repaint the mosque's dome green.

The People's Mosque appears on the Yemeni currency. It is depicted on the face of the 2009 issue 250-rial note.

Architecture and fittings
The mosque was constructed using different types of stone, including black basalt stones as well as limestone in red, white and black. The building is compared in its beauty and architectural elegance with the Masjid al-Haram, in Mecca. It was built in a fusion of "Yemeni architecture and Islamic styles", with many Quranic verses inscribed on the walls. The layout is referred to as "Himyarite architecture".

The building has wooden roofs and seven ornate domes. Windows fitted with stained glass are locally referred to as qamariyah. Of the fifteen wooden doors, ten of them are situated on the eastern and western sides, and five open south towards the Islamic college and ablution areas.

While the plush carpeting contains intricate patterns, huge chandeliers have colorful and flower-like patterns. The three-storied building that includes the Quran College also contains libraries, and over two dozen classrooms, enough space to accommodate 600 students. Three large rooms are specifically for women; a small hall can accommodate 2,000 women.

The mosque has a modern central air conditioning and sound systems, as well as full security arrangements, including bomb-sniffing dogs. The building stays lit through the night. Thorn Lighting International, through its distributor Al Zaghir, was the lighting contractor. Diah International served as the subcontractor for civil and mechanical engineering; Sodaco Engineering & Contracting also provided services in the building's construction.

Grounds
Situated close the presidential palace, the mosque is set within Al-Sabeen Square, which is the country's largest parade square. The mosque was built on a large area of land that was acquired from Beit Zuhra, a well-known local family; it is said that when Zuhra refused to sell the land at a low price, his eldest son was abducted for ransom and released three months later, after Zuhra agreed to sell the land for the mosque at a low price. Nearby is an amusement park named FunCity. The grounds include sprawling gardens, green courtyards, and parking space for thousands of vehicles, part of an integrated services plan.

Worshipers
As people of all religions can visit the mosque, tourists are present in large numbers. The mosque also promotes moderate Islam, to a large number of people, which is considered a positive feature in the light of the influence of Al-Qaeda. Women pray in an enclosed area separated from the main central hall. The Saleh Mosque is the only Yemeni mosque where police and bomb-sniffing dogs are used for inspecting worshippers. Prayers are also broadcast over the national television network to reach a larger viewing audience.

References

External links
 One of the most beautiful adhaan ever! Yemen – Sana'a – Saleh Mosque (YouTube)
 Ramadan at Al Saleh Masjid in Sana'a Yemen
 جامع الصالح تحفة فنية تباهي مساجد العالم 06 – 06 – 2016 (in Arabic)
 الجامع الصالح في صنعاء اليمن – اجمل مساجد العالم

2008 establishments in Yemen
Mosques completed in 2008
Mosques in Sanaa